The sodium fusion test, or Lassaigne's test, is used in elemental analysis for the qualitative determination of the presence of foreign elements, namely halogens, nitrogen, and sulfur, in an organic compound. It was developed by J. L. Lassaigne.

The test involves heating the sample with sodium metal, "fusing" it with the sample. A variety of techniques has been described. The "fused" sample is plunged into water, and the qualitative tests are performed on the resultant solution for the respective possible constituents.

Theory
The halogens, nitrogen, and sulfur are covalently bonded to the organic compounds are converted to various sodium salts formed during the fusion. Typically proposed reactions are:
Na + C + N → NaCN

Na + C + N + S → NaSCN

2Na + S → Na2S

Na + X → NaX
The fate of the hydrocarbon portion of the sample is disregarded.

The aqueous extract is called sodium fusion extract or Lassaigne's extract.

Test for nitrogen
The sodium fusion extract is made alkaline by adding NaOH. To this mixture, freshly prepared FeSO4 solution is added and boiled for sometimes and then cooled. A few drops of FeCl3 are added and Prussian blue (bluish green) color forms due to formation of ferric ferrocyanide along with NaCl. This shows the presence of nitrogen in the organic compound.6CN- +Fe^2+ -> [Fe(CN)6]^4-{3[Fe(CN)6]}^{4-} +4Fe^3+ ->[\ce{xH2O}]Fe4[Fe(CN)6]3\cdot xH2O

Test for halogens
The sodium fusion extract is boiled with concentrated HNO3 followed by the addition of AgNO3 solution which yields a white (AgCl) or yellow (AgBr or AgI) precipitate if halogen is present.NaX + AgNO3 -> AgX + NaNO3

Test for phosphorus 

Sodium peroxide is added to the compound to oxidise phosphorus to sodium phosphate. It is boiled with concentrated HNO3 and then ammonium molybdate is added. A yellow precipitate indicates the presence of phosphorus.

Test for sulphur

Lead acetate test 
The sodium fusion extract is acidified with acetic acid and lead acetate is added to it. A black precipitate of lead sulphide indicates the presence of sulfur.

Sodium nitroprusside test 
Freshly prepared sodium nitroprusside solution is added to the sodium fusion extract, deep violet colouration appears due to formation of sodium thionitroprusside. S2- + [Fe(CN)5NO]^2- -> [Fe(CN)5NOS]^4-

References

External links
 Lab Manual from the University of West Indies, Mona

Chemical tests
Sodium
Elemental analysis